Overwatch is a multimedia franchise based on a multiplayer shooter video game series.

Overwatch may also refer to:

Media and entertainment

Overwatch franchise
 Overwatch (video game), the first game in the series
 Overwatch animated media 
 Overwatch (digital comic series) 
 Overwatch League, an esports league for the video game series

Other uses in media and entertainment
 Overwatch, the military forces of the Combine in the video game Half-Life 2
 Overwatch, the alias of the DC Comics character Felicity Smoak in the television series Arrow

Military
 Overwatch (military tactic)
 Bounding overwatch, another military tactic
 Overwatch Battle Group (West), a former Australian Army unit

Other uses
 Overwatch, now Geospatial Solutions, a company owned by Textron Systems

See also 
 Overlook (disambiguation)